The 2003 season of the Ukrainian Championship was the 12th season of Ukraine's women's football competitions. The championship ran from 30 April to 31 October 2003.

Teams

Team changes

Name changes
 FC Kharkiv changed its name to Kharkiv-Kondytsioner Kharkiv.
 TsPOR was merged with Metalurh-Donchanka and changed its name to TsPOR-Donchanka.
 Iunist Poltava changed its name to Kolos Poltava.
 Kyiv had three teams debuting, while previously the last Kyivan team that competed was in 2001

First stage

Group 1

Group 2

Second stage

Top scorers

References

External links
WFPL.ua
Women's Football.ua

2003
2003–04 in Ukrainian association football leagues
2002–03 in Ukrainian association football leagues
Ukrainian Women's League
Ukrainian Women's League